It's Not About the Melody is a 1992 studio album by the American jazz singer Betty Carter.

Reception

The Allmusic review by Ron Wynn awarded the album four stars, and described Carter as "a vocal improviser in a manner few have equaled, and if her voice lacks the clarity and timbre of the all-time greats, she's more than compensated with incredible timing, flexibility and power."

Track listing

Personnel
 Betty Carter - vocals
 Cyrus Chestnut - piano
 John Hicks - piano
 Mulgrew Miller - piano
 Craig Handy - tenor saxophone
 Walter Booker - double bass
 Christian McBride - bass
 Ariel J. Roland - bass
 Jeff "Tain" Watts - drums
 Lewis Nash - drums
 Clarence Penn - drums

References

1992 albums
Betty Carter albums
Verve Records albums